Maria Quintana  (born 1966) is an American freestyle skier and world champion.

She won a gold medal in aerials at the FIS Freestyle World Ski Championships 1986 in Tignes. At the FIS Freestyle World Ski Championships 1989 in Oberjoch, she placed seventh in aerials.

She took part at the 1988 Winter Olympics in Calgary, where aerials was a demonstration event.

References

External links 
 

1966 births
Living people
American female freestyle skiers
21st-century American women